Carl Schenkel (pseudonym: Carlo Ombra; 8 May 1948 – 1 December 2003) was a Swiss film director. His 1984 film Abwärts won the Bavarian Film Award for Best Direction in 1985.

Filmography
 Graf Dracula beißt jetzt in Oberbayern (1979) (as Carlo Ombra)
  (Kalt wie Eis) (1981)
 Abwärts (1984)
 Bay Coven (1987) (TV movie)
 The Mighty Quinn (1989)
 Silence Like Glass (Zwei Frauen) (1989)
 The Edge (1989) (TV movie)
 Silhouette (1990) (TV movie)
 Knight Moves (1992)
 Beyond Betrayal (1992) (TV movie)
 The Surgeon (1995)
 In the Lake of the Woods (1996) (TV movie)
 Kalte Küsse (1997) (TV movie)
 Tarzan and the Lost City (1998)
 Missing Pieces (2000)
 Hostile Takeover (2001)
 Murder on the Orient Express (2001) (TV movie)

References

External links
 

1948 births
2003 deaths
People from Bern
Swiss film directors